John Allen (25 May 1810 - 13 December 1886) was Archdeacon of Salop from 15 December 1847 until 23 March 1886.

Allen was born at Burton, Pembrokeshire where his father was the rector. He was educated at Westminster School and Trinity College, Cambridge. He was ordained in 1834 and became a Lecturer at King's College London. In 1846 he became Vicar of Prees, a pos he held until 1883.

References

19th-century English Anglican priests
1810 births
1886 deaths
People from Pembrokeshire
19th-century Welsh Anglican priests
Alumni of Trinity College, Cambridge
Academics of King's College London
Archdeacons of Salop
People educated at Westminster School, London